HydroGen4 is the successor of the fuel cell vehicle HydroGen3, developed by General Motors/Opel and presented in 2007 at the IAA in Frankfurt, Germany. It is expected that automotive hydrogen technology, such as the type featured in the HydroGen4, may enter the early commercialization phase in the 2015 - 2020 time frame.

Specification

The vehicle is based on the Chevrolet Equinox and has a GM fuel cell with 440 cells and an output of 93 kW. The hybrid powertrain also contains a nickel-metal-hydride battery with an energy content of 1.8 kWh/35 kW and a three-phase synchronous motor with 73 kW continuous power and 320 Nm of torque. The peak power of the engine is 94 kW. The maximum speed is 160 km/h with an acceleration from 0 to 100 km/h in 12 seconds. The HydroGen4 was produced in a batch of 170 pcs from which 10 for the Clean Energy Partnership project in Berlin.

See also
List of fuel cell vehicles

References

External links

  HydroGen4

Fuel cell vehicles
Crossover sport utility vehicles
All-wheel-drive vehicles
Front-wheel-drive vehicles
Cars introduced in 2007
General Motors vehicles
2010s cars